Crisler may refer to:

 Fritz Crisler (1899–1982), American college football coach
 Crisler Center, an indoor arena located in Ann Arbor, Michigan
 Harold Crisler (1923–1987), American football player
 Jalen Crisler (born 1994), American soccer player